The Men's +105 kg event at the 2010 South American Games was held over March 29 at 20:00.

Medalists

Results

References
Final

+105kg M